Joseph J. Kunzeman (September 1, 1927 – May 2, 2008) was an American politician who served in the New York State Assembly from 1966 to 1971.

He died on May 2, 2008, in Jericho, New York at age 80.

References

1927 births
2008 deaths
Republican Party members of the New York State Assembly
20th-century American politicians